Acajete may refer to:

Places
Acajete Municipality, Puebla, Mexico
Acajete, Puebla, the municipal capital of the above
Acajete Municipality, Veracruz, Mexico